Robert McCallum may refer to:

 Robert McCallum Jr. (born 1946), American attorney and diplomat
 Robert Hope McCallum (1864–1939), builder, entrepreneur, and social figure in Auckland, New Zealand
 Robert McCallum, pseudonym of Gary Graver, American film director